The El Mers Group is a geological group in the Middle Atlas of Morocco. It is subdivided into 3 formations named the El Mers 1, 2 and 3 Formations respectively. It is a marine deposit primarily consisting of marl, with gypsum present in the upper part of unit 3. and is the lateral equivalent of the terrestrial Guettioua Sandstone. Dinosaur remains are among the fossils that have been recovered from the group, most notably those of indeterminate theropods (=Allosauridae indet. and =Megalosauridae? indet.), the sauropod "Cetiosaurus" mogrebiensis, the stegosaur Adratiklit, the ankylosaur Spicomellus, the inchnofossil Selenichnites and an indeterminate teleosauroid (=Machimosauridae indet.).

References 

Geologic groups of Africa
Geologic formations of Morocco
Jurassic System of Africa
Jurassic Morocco
Bathonian Stage
Callovian Stage
Shale formations
Evaporite deposits
Ichnofossiliferous formations
Paleontology in Morocco